Codru may refer to:

Codru (forest), a type of forest
Codru (wine), a Moldovan wine region
Codru, a village in Șoimi Commune, Bihor County, Romania
Codru, a village in the town of Cajvana, Suceava County, Romania
Codru, Moldova, a town in the municipality of Chişinău, Moldova
Codru, a village in Mîndreşti Commune, Teleneşti district, Moldova

See also
Codreanu (surname)
Codreni (disambiguation)
Codruț - a Romanian given name — search for "Codruț"
Codrescu - a Romanian family name — search for "Codrescu"